
Gmina Bełżyce is an urban-rural gmina (administrative district) in Lublin County, Lublin Voivodeship, in eastern Poland.

Villages
Apart from the town of Bełżyce, Gmina Bełżyce contains the villages and settlements of Babin, Chmielnik, Chmielnik-Kolonia, Cuple, Jaroszewice, Kierz, Krężnica Okrągła, Malinowszczyzna, Matczyn, Płowizny, Podole, Skrzyniec, Skrzyniec-Kolonia, Stare Wierzchowiska, Wierzchowiska Dolne, Wierzchowiska Górne, Wojcieszyn, Wronów, Wymysłówka, Zagórze, Zalesie and Zosin.

Neighbouring gminas
Gmina Bełżyce is bordered by the gminas of Borzechów, Chodel, Konopnica, Niedrzwica Duża, Poniatowa and Wojciechów.

References

Belzyce
Lublin County